Centaurea jacea, brown knapweed or brownray knapweed, is a species of herbaceous perennial plants in the genus Centaurea native to dry meadows and open woodland throughout Europe.

In Britain and America, it is often found as a hybrid of black knapweed, Centaurea nigra. Unlike the black knapweed, the flower heads always look as if they are rayed, forming a more open star rather than a brush-like tuft.

Centaurea ×moncktonii is a fertile hybrid between black knapweed and brown knapweed.

References

External links

jacea
Flora of Europe
Flora of North Africa
Plants described in 1753
Taxa named by Carl Linnaeus